Antonio Juan Barragán Fernández (born 12 June 1987) is a Spanish professional footballer who plays as a right-back.

Having started out at Liverpool, he spent most of his career in the two highest divisions of Spanish football, playing for Deportivo, Valladolid, Valencia, Betis and Elche. In La Liga, he amassed totals of 251 games and three goals over 13 seasons.

Barragán earned 21 caps for Spain at youth level.

Club career

Liverpool
Born in Pontedeume, Galicia, Barragán signed for Liverpool in July 2005, as an 18-year-old who had yet to appear for Sevilla FC's first team.

He, however, spent the 2005–06 season with the club's reserves, managing one appearance for the first team, as a substitute for fellow Spaniard Fernando Morientes in the first leg of the third qualifying round of the UEFA Champions League against PFC CSKA Sofia. In doing so, he became the youngest foreigner to play for the Reds.

Deportivo
Barragán signed a five-year deal with Deportivo de La Coruña on 4 August 2006, in an operation that cost €1 million. His time at his new team began well, as he was in the starting eleven for the first eight La Liga matches and scored against Real Sociedad in a 2–0 home win, subsequently alternating in the right-back position with Manuel Pablo until he fractured his knee in April 2008, being out of action for the rest of the campaign and not featuring at all in 2008–09.

In 2008, Deportivo released Barragán from his contract without his consent. He successfully sued the club for an indemnity of €400.000, even though it later decided to reverse its previous decision and restore him to the squad.

Valladolid
In early June 2009, Barragán moved to Real Valladolid on a three-year contract. He played one season apiece in each of the two major levels of Spanish football, appearing in 17 league games in 2009–10 (14 starts) as the campaign ended in relegation.

Valencia
On 30 August 2011, Valladolid announced that Barragán would be leaving for Valencia CF in a deal worth €1.5 million. During his first season, all three right-backs – himself, Bruno and Miguel– appeared in roughly the same number of games as the Che finished third and once again qualified to the Champions League.

Barragán scored his first competitive goal for Valencia on 13 March 2014, his team's first in a 3–0 away victory over PFC Ludogorets Razgrad in the campaign's UEFA Europa League. He continued battling for first-choice status with another Portuguese, João Pereira.

On 5 January 2015, Barragán netted his first league goal for the side, equalising in an eventual 2–1 home defeat of Real Madrid which ended the visitors' record 22-match unbeaten run.

Middlesbrough
Barragán returned to England after ten years on 15 July 2016, agreeing to a three-year contract with Middlesbrough. He made his Premier League debut on 13 August, playing the full 90 minutes in a 1–1 home draw against Stoke City.

Betis
On 6 July 2017, Barragán returned to Spain and its first division after agreeing to a one-year loan deal with Real Betis. Roughly one year later, the move was made permanent.

Elche
On 4 October 2020, Barragán signed a one-year contract with Elche CF, newly-returned to the top tier.

International career
Barragán was part of the Spain under-19 team that emerged victorious at the 2006 UEFA European Championship in Poland. Just a few months later, following solid performances with Deportivo and former Sevilla teammate Antonio Puerta's call-up to the senior side, he was promoted to the under-21s.

In December 2006, Barragán appeared for the Galicia unofficial team in a friendly match against Ecuador.

Career statistics

References

External links

CiberChe biography and stats 

1987 births
Living people
People from O Eume
Sportspeople from the Province of A Coruña
Spanish footballers
Footballers from Galicia (Spain)
Association football defenders
La Liga players
Segunda División players
Sevilla FC players
Deportivo de La Coruña players
Real Valladolid players
Valencia CF players
Real Betis players
Elche CF players
Premier League players
Liverpool F.C. players
Middlesbrough F.C. players
Spain youth international footballers
Spain under-21 international footballers
Spanish expatriate footballers
Expatriate footballers in England
Spanish expatriate sportspeople in England